Barry L. Frankhauser is an archaeologist who has worked in Australia and New Zealand.

Works
Frankhauser's Ph.D. thesis (published 1986) was a study of historical uses of the cabbage tree, an important food and fibre source in the Māori culture for at least 800 years.  The Māori Television network produced a TV documentary on the subject, using his thesis as a starting point, which aired in 2004. The documentary includes an interview with Frankhauser.

In 1990 Frankhauser participated in a two-day seminar (Geochemical Methods for Dating of Rock Art) held in Canberra, which drew archeologists from three continents to evaluate the scientific soundness of the cation-ratio method of dating ancient rock art specimens.  That seminar concluded that the method had significant drawbacks and should be re-evaluated as a definitive test.

References

Smith, M.A., M. Spriggs, and B. Frankhauser (eds) 1993 Sahul in review: Pleistocene archaeology in Australia, New Guinea and Island Melanesia. Department of Prehistory, Research School of Pacific Studies, Australian National University, Canberra. Occasional papers in prehistory 24

External links
Australian National University - PREH2004 : Australian Prehistory - 2nd Semester 2001
Society for Archaeological Sciences

Australian archaeologists
Living people
Year of birth missing (living people)